Cihan Çanak (born 24 January 2005) is a Belgian professional footballer who plays for Standard Liège.

Early life 
Çanak is from Verviers, in the Wallonian province of Liège, with his family being of Turkish origins.

Club career 
Cihan Çanak first joined Standard de Liège's first team during the summer 2021 pre-season, before signing a new contract with the club the following October. He made his professional debut for the Standard on 26 December 2021, replacing Niels Nkounkou in the last minutes of a 0–1 home Division 1A defeat against Zulte-Waregem.

International career 
Already an international with Belgium under-15s, Cihan Çanak was also selected with the under-17 in October 2021, whilst also being called for Turkey youth teams, from the under-14 to the under-17.

Personal life 
Çanak is of Turkish descent.

References

External links

2005 births
Living people
Belgian footballers
Turkish footballers
Belgian people of Turkish descent
Belgium youth international footballers
Turkey youth international footballers
Association football forwards
Standard Liège players
Belgian Pro League players
People from Verviers
Footballers from Liège Province